Levon "Fred" Agabashian (August 21, 1913 – October 13, 1989) was an American racer of midget cars and Indy cars.

Career

Midget car racing

Agabashian competed in his first midget car race in his teens. His first championship was the 1937 Northern California Racing Association against such drivers as Duane Carter, Lynn Deister, and Paul Swedberg. He captured the 1946 BCRA championship for Jack London. He won the 1947 and 1948 BCRA championships for George Bignotti.

Championship racing

Agabashian qualified for his first Indianapolis 500 in 1947 and finished 9th. He made the next 11 500s with a best finish of 4th in 1953, the extremely hot race day where he was relieved by Paul Russo. He qualified on the pole in 1952 in the Cummins Diesel Special, the first turbocharged Indy race car, but it dropped out after 71 laps.

Agabashian won one Championship race, a 100-mile contest at the Fairgrounds in Sacramento, CA in 1949.

He retired from the sport after failing to qualify at Indianapolis in 1958.

Broadcaster
After his retirement, Agabashian did color commentary for the Indianapolis Motor Speedway Radio Network, serving from 1959 to 1965 and again from 1973 to 1977.

Death

He died on 13 October 1989 at Alamo, California and was cremated.

Recognition
Agabashian was inducted in the National Midget Auto Racing Hall of Fame, and in 2005, the Indianapolis Motor Speedway Hall of Fame.

Racing record

USAC results
(key) (Races in bold indicate pole position)

Indianapolis 500 results

Complete Formula One World Championship results
(key)

References

External links

1913 births
1989 deaths
Sportspeople from Modesto, California
Racing drivers from California
Indianapolis 500 drivers
Indianapolis 500 polesitters
American people of Armenian descent
AAA Championship Car drivers